Bogong is a locality in north east Victoria, Australia.
 

Climate

Bogong has particularly wet winters with snowfalls commonplace.

References

External links

Towns in Victoria (Australia)
Alpine Shire